Dompu Regency is a regency of the Indonesian Province of West Nusa Tenggara. It is located on the island of Sumbawa and the capital is Dompu.  It is bordered to the north and to the east by two non-contiguous parts of Bima Regency, and to the west by Sumbawa Regency, as well as on its coasts by Saleh Bay, Sanggar Bay, and Cempi Bay. It covers an area of 2,324.55 km2, and the population at the 2010 Census was 218,984 and at the 2020 Census was 236,665; the official estimate as at mid 2021 was 238,201.

Administrative Districts 
Dompu Regency consists of eight districts (kecamatan), tabulated below with their areas and their populations at the 2010 Census and the 2020 Census, together with the official estimates as at mid 2021. The table also includes the locations of the district administrative centres, the number of administrative villages (rural desa and urban kelurahan) and the number of offshore islands in each district, and its postal codes.

Notes: (a) except the villages of Kandai II (with a post code of 84218) and Monta Baru (with a post code of 84219). (b) comprises the southern half of the Sanggar Peninsula, plus the small island of Satonda off the north coast of that peninsula.

The 81 villages include 72 rural desa and 9 urban kelurahan - the latter comprise 6 in Dompu District and 3 in Woja District.

References

External links 

 
 Hägerdal, Hans (2017), Held's History of Sumbawa. Amsterdam: Amsterdam University Press.

Regencies of West Nusa Tenggara